Parlet was a female spinoff group from P-Funk formed by veteran background vocalists Mallia Franklin, Jeanette Washington and Debbie Wright. Washington and Wright were the first female members in Parliament-Funkadelic in 1975.

Discography

References

American funk musical groups
P-Funk groups
Casablanca Records artists
African-American girl groups